Creeks and Crawdads is a role-playing game published by Crustacium Games in 1986.

Description
Creeks and Crawdads is a fantasy system in which the player characters are intelligent mutant crawdads.

Publication history
Creeks and Crawdads was designed by M. Martin Costa, and published by Crustacium Games in 1986 as a 24-page book.

Reception
Lawrence Schick comments that "The rules are completely unserious, the scenarios are ludicrous, and life in general is cheap. But who cares? They're only crawdads."

References

Comedy role-playing games
Role-playing games introduced in 1986